Dr. Assem Jaber is a Lebanese diplomat and is a former Ambassador of Lebanon to Russia, presented his credentials to Russian President Vladimir Putin on 22 January 2004.

Born in Lebanon 1946. Married with two Children

Education: B. A. in Law, M. A. in Private Law, M. A. in Public Law, PhD in Public International Law  (Lebanese University, Beirut). Graduate of the Institute of Administration and Development (Beirut).

Professional Career: Secretary, Jeddah, Saudi Arabia (1972–1977). Charge'  d'Affaires, Havana, Cuba (1977–1979). Counsellor Research Center MFA, Beirut, Lebanon (1979–1981). Charge' d'Affaires, Conakry, Guinea, (1981–1983). Ambassador of Lebanon in Accra, Ghana (1983–1988). Director of Protocol, MFA, Beirut, Lebanon (1988–1990). Ambassador of Lebanon in Ottawa, Canada, (1990–2000) and Dean of Arab Diplomatic Corps (1994–2000). Director of Administration and Finance, MFA, Beirut, Lebanon (2000–2003). Ambassador of Lebanon in Moscow, Russia (2003–2010) and Dean of Arab Diplomatic Corps (2008–2010). Retired, June 2010. Member of the Administrative Committee of the Circle of Lebanese Ambassadors, Beirut, Lebanon (1913---). Participated and  Represented Lebanon at several International Meetings and Conferences ( UN New York. Islamic Conference, Jeddah, KSA. Summit of Non Aligned Movement, Havana, Cuba. Francophone Summit, Moncton, Canada. Arab Summit, Beirut, Lebanon. Conference of Anti-Personnel Mine Ban, Ottawa, Canada. Kimprly Process Meeting, Moscow, Russian Federation etc ... ) . Presided in 2002 the Committee for recruiting new Lebanese diplomats.

Former Lecturer in Law. Faculty of Law, Lebanese University, Beirut, Lebanon.

Published several researches, articles and books among them is his book Consualr and Diplomatic Function in Law and Practice, Oueidat, Beirut.

Holder of the Russian International Cooperation Decoration, and many other awards and certificates of tribute.

References 

Living people
Ambassadors of Lebanon to Russia
Year of birth missing (living people)